Toun Okewale Sonaiya is a Nigerian radio broadcaster. In 2015, she launched WFM 91.7, the first radio station for women in Nigeria. Sonaiya is also the Chief Executive Officer (CEO) of WFM 91.7 .

Biography 
Sonaiya previously worked for Ogun State Broadcasting Corporation, Ray Power and Choice FM. She has also worked with Housing for Women, and been the Executive Director at St. Ives Communications. Toun Okewale Sonaiya is a media entrepreneur and broadcaster who has practiced in Nigeria and London.

In an interview she was asked at what point did she decide she wanted to start a specialized radio station for women ?
Sonaiya replied "Precisely 2010 when 2 of my directors and I decided to activate our vision for a female - centric radio station , something different to complement existing radio stations . We applied to NBC under St . Ives Communications Ltd . In June 2016 we got a license and to the Glory of God within 6 months on 18th of December 2016 – we launched."

Career 
One of the success stories of Women Radio under. Toun's leadership comes from  "TheWomenAgenda"  – a programme aimed at mainstreaming women and girls as drivers of the anti-corruption and accountability campaign in Nigeria. This intervention has student and women led #genderandaccountability clubs that lead campaigns at local levels to ensure allocated resources are effectively utilized. This initiative is currently active in Lagos and Ogun state with plans to expand nationwide.

She was the first African female voice of BBC's  "One for all"  educational campaign in Africa, the first voice on Ogun Radio FM and the first African female presenter and producer at Choice 107.1 FM (now Capital Extra , London , UK ). She has interviewed personalities including the late Miriam Makeba, Ladysmith Black Mambazo from South Africa , Cameroonian Manu Dibango , Malian Oumou Sangare , Professor Remi Sonaiya , Nigeria's only female presidential candidate in the 2015 and Internationally acclaimed Feminist, Erelu Bisi Fayemi amongst others. 
She moderates and comperes conferences and seminars on the national and International sphere.

A United Nations' advocate, Toun is passionately involved in the development and advancement of the female gender. Her unwavering commitment in support of women issues is further evidenced by her work with ex-female offenders, female prisoners, trafficked women, victims of domestic violence, widows and other vulnerable females in Nigeria and UK. Her avidity further inspired "EquipHer" - a skills acquisition and free startup initiative for Women and Girls in contribution to the UN's number 1 SDG goal of eradicating poverty by 2030.
She lends her voice to the cause of women in leadership and governance through Voice Of Women Conference (VOW), a yearly gathering of 500+ women and girls.

Okewale Sonaiya is a board member, director and trustee of several organizations including Centre for Women's Health and Information, Transformative Leadership and Sustainable Initiative, Maami (an NGO empowering disadvantaged Women & Girls), Ives Medicare, member Nigerian Electricity Regulatory Commission's (NERC) Review Code Panel and founding member of Nigerian Women in Diaspora Leadership Forum, UK.

References

External links 
 WFM 91.7

Year of birth missing (living people)
Living people
Nigerian business executives
People from Abeokuta
Nigerian women in business
Nigerian motivational speakers
Nigerian broadcasters
Olabisi Onabanjo University alumni
Yoruba women in business
Yoruba radio personalities
Nigerian radio company founders
Nigerian radio producers
Women radio producers
Nigerian women radio presenters
Nigerian radio presenters